In vacanza su Marte is a 2020 Italian comedy film directed by Neri Parenti.

Plot
In 2030, Fabio Sinceri is due to get married to his wealthy fiancée Bea and, considering that he is still legally married to his ex-wife Elena, decides to go to Mars, where there is no jurisdiction, to get married. To his misfortune, his son Giulio, who is determined to get mom and dad back together, catches him in the act and follows him to Mars accompanied by his fiancée Marina, who plans to expose the fake relationship between two popular influencers in order to try to gain success. Unfortunately, Giulio, during a trip to space, is sucked into a mini black hole that advances his age by about fifty years.

Production 
Filming took place in a studio in Cinecittà.

Distribution 
The film, due to the closure of cinemas caused by the COVID-19 pandemic, did not have a theatrical distribution. On 13 December 2020, the film will be released on demand, which can be purchased or rented on the Sky Primafila, Amazon Prime Video, Apple TV, Chili, TIMvision, Infinity, Google Play Film, YouTube, Rakuten Tv and PlayStation Store platforms.

The film was be shown broadcast for the first time on TV on December 29 exclusively on Sky Cinema.

The film reaches over 800,000 spectators on Sky Cinema in the first 10 days of broadcasting.

Cast

References

External links

2020 films
Films directed by Neri Parenti
Films scored by Bruno Zambrini
2020s Italian-language films
2020 comedy films
2020s science fiction comedy films
Films set in 2030
Mars in film
Italian science fiction comedy films
Productions using StageCraft
2020s Christmas comedy films
Italian Christmas comedy films
Warner Bros. films
2020s Italian films